The China national under-23 football team, also known as the China Olympic team (国奥队), represents the People's Republic of China in international football competitions in the Olympic Games, Asian Games, as well as any other under-23 international football tournaments. It is governed by the Chinese Football Association (CFA). It combines two teams: China U-23 national team and China U-21 selection team.

Competition history 
* DNE = Did not enter; DNQ = Did not qualify; QBW = Qualified but withdrew. 
* Pos = Position; P = Matches played; W = Matches won; D = Matches drawn; L = Matches lost; F = Goals for; A = Goals against. 
* Denotes draws include knockout matches decided on penalty kicks.

Olympic Games record 
 For 1900 to 1988, see China national football team.

* Including 1900 to 1988

Asian Games record 
 For 1951 to 1998, see China national football team.

* Including 1951 to 1998

East Asian Games record

AFC U-23 Championship record

Recent results and fixtures

2022

U-23 national team

Olympic Games fixtures

2008 Olympic Games 
 Football at the 2008 Summer Olympics – Men's tournament
All times local (GMT+8)

Players

China U-23 current squad 
The following players were called up for 2018 Asian Games.

China U-21 current squad 
The following players were called up for 2018 Toulon Tournament.

Previous squads 

Olympic Games
 2008 Summer Olympics squads – China
Asian Games
 2014 Asian Games squads – China
 2010 Asian Games squads – China
 2006 Asian Games squads – China

AFC U-23 Championship
 2013 AFC U-22 Championship
 2016 AFC U-23 Championship
 2018 AFC U-23 Championship

Overage players in Olympic Games

China U-23 captains 
{| class="wikitable" style="text-align:center;"
|-
!Period
!Captain
!Vice Captain
!Third Captain
|-
|1990–1992
|style="text-align:left;"|Fan Zhiyi
|style="text-align:left;"|Xu Hong
| —
|-
|1993–1994
|style="text-align:left;"|Zhang Enhua
|style="text-align:left;"|Yang Chen
| —
|-
|1995–1996
|style="text-align:left;"|Shen Si
|style="text-align:left;"|Zhang Enhua
| –
|-
|1998–1999
|style="text-align:left;"|Li Weifeng
|style="text-align:left;"|Zhang Ran
| —
|-
|2001–2004
|style="text-align:left;"|Du Wei
|style="text-align:left;"|Hu Zhaojun
| —
|-
|2006
|style="text-align:left;"|Chen Tao
|—
| —
|-
|2006 Asian Games
|style="text-align:left;"|Zheng Zhi
| —
| —
|-
|2007
|style="text-align:left;"|Chen Tao
|style="text-align:left;"|Feng Xiaoting
|style="text-align:left;"|Zhou Haibin
|-
|2007–2008
|style="text-align:left;"|Li Weifeng
|style="text-align:left;"|Zhou Haibin
| —
|-
|2008 Olympic Games
|style="text-align:left;"|Zheng Zhi
|style="text-align:left;"|Li Weifeng
|style="text-align:left;"|Zhou Haibin
|-
|2009–2010
|style="text-align:left;"|Zhang Linpeng
|style="text-align:left;"|Wu Xi 
|style="text-align:left;"|Piao Cheng
|-
|2010 Asian Games
|style="text-align:left;"|Wang Dalei
|style="text-align:left;"|Zhang Linpeng
|style="text-align:left;"|Wu Xi 
|-
|2011
|style="text-align:left;"|Wang Dalei
|style="text-align:left;"|Zhang Linpeng
|style="text-align:left;"|Wu Xi 
|-
|2012
|style="text-align:left;"|Jin Jingdao
| —
| —
|-
|2013–2014
|style="text-align:left;"|Shi Ke
|style="text-align:left;"|Wang Tong
| —
|-
|2014 Asian Games
|style="text-align:left;"|Shi Ke
|style="text-align:left;"|Li Ang
| —
|-
|2015
|style="text-align:left;"|Wang Tong
|style="text-align:left;"|Shi Ke
| —
|-
|2016
|style="text-align:left;"|Chen Zhechao
|style="text-align:left;"|Cheng Jin
| —
|-
|2017–2018
|style="text-align:left;"|He Chao
|style="text-align:left;"|Gao Zhunyi
| —
</table>

Coaching staffs

China U-23 coaching staff

China U-21 coaching staff

List of head coaches 
Manage records only includes international results.

 From 1981–1983 as "China Expectful team", 1983–1990 as "China B team".

as China National Olympic team.

References

External links 
 Team China Official Website 
 Team China Official Website 
 Chinese Football Association Official Website 
 Profile on FIFA 
 Profile on Beijing 2008

Asian national under-23 association football teams
Under-23